, better known by his stage name , was a Japanese actor.

Life
Ogata was born in Tokyo, Japan. Ogata is well known for his roles in Peter Greenaway's The Pillow Book, Paul Schrader's Mishima: A Life in Four Chapters and Shohei Imamura's The Ballad of Narayama. He won the award for best actor at the 26th Blue Ribbon Awards for Okinawan Boys.

In television, his starring role as Toyotomi Hideyoshi in the 1965 NHK Taiga drama Taikōki catapulted him to fame. Ken went on to many prominent roles in subsequent programs. The following year, he portrayed Benkei in Minamoto no Yoshitsune. The network tapped him again for the role of Fujiwara no Sumitomo in the 1976 Kaze to Kumo to Niji to. He returned to playing Hideyoshi in the 1978 Ōgon no Hibi, and returned to the lead as Ōishi Kuranosuke in Tōge no Gunzō, the 1982 Chūshingura. Another featured appearance in a Taiga drama was in Taiheiki (1991, as Ashikaga Sadauji, father of Takauji). His final appearance in the taiga drama was Fūrin Kazan in 2007. Besides the taiga drama series, Ogata portrayed Fujieda Baian in the Hissatsu series Hissatsu Shikakenin, he reprised the character twice in the film series later. 

Mr. Ogata died of liver cancer on October 5, 2008, just days after finishing his role in the production of the Fuji TV drama Kaze no Garden (Garden of the Winds), filmed in the rural Furano area of northern Japan. In his final role, Ogata, himself 71 years of age, played a doctor involved in the end-of-life care of elderly patients.

His sons Kanta and Naoto are actors.

Filmography

Film

Television

Japanese dub
The Golden Compass – Iorek Byrnison (2008)

Honours 
Medal with Purple Ribbon (2000)
Order of the Rising Sun, 4th Class, Gold Rays with Rosette (2008)

References

External links

Ken Ogata's Blog, hara8bunme (in Japanese)

Japanese male actors
People from Tokyo
Deaths from liver cancer
Deaths from cancer in Japan
1937 births
2008 deaths
Taiga drama lead actors
Recipients of the Medal with Purple Ribbon
Recipients of the Order of the Rising Sun, 4th class